Sir Fitzroy Hamilton Niall Anstruther-Gough-Calthorpe, 1st Baronet ADC (5 July 1872 – 29 September 1957), born FitzRoy Hamilton Niall Lloyd-Anstruther, was an English baronet.

Life
Educated at Harrow School, he joined the army as a staff officer.  On 7 November 1910 he changed his surname name from Lloyd-Anstruther to Anstruther-Gough-Calthorpe, discarding the name of Lloyd and adding his wife's surnames.  Before the First World War he served as a part-time Lieutenant in the Army Motor Reserve, then in September 1915 was appointed as an ADC on the General Staff, ending the war with the rank of Captain.  He was created a Baronet on 1 July 1929.

Family 
He was the son of Lieutenant-Colonel Robert Hamilton Lloyd-Anstruther (1841–1914), by his marriage on 5 July 1871 to Gertrude Louisa Georgina FitzRoy (1850–1923), a daughter of Francis Horatio FitzRoy (1823–1900), by his marriage in 1849 to the Hon. Gertrude Duncombe (1827–1916).  His paternal grandparents were James Hamilton Lloyd-Anstruther (1806–1882) and Georgiana Charlotte Burrell (1811–1843), who had been married in 1838.

He had a brother, Reginald Lloyd-Anstruther, who died as a child in 1875, and a sister, Rosalind Gertrude (died 1903), the wife of Brigadier General Noel Armar Lowry-Corry (1867–1935), by whom she had issue.

Marriage and issue
On 11 October 1898, FitzRoy Lloyd-Anstruther (as he then was) married the Hon. Rachel Gough-Calthorpe (1871-1951), a daughter of Augustus Gough-Calthorpe, 6th Baron Calthorpe, and Maud Augusta Louisa Duncombe.  They had issue: 
 Sir Richard Anstruther-Gough-Calthorpe, 2nd Baronet, who married Nancy Moireach Malcolmson, and had issue
 Frances Jean Anstruther-Gough-Calthorpe (born 29 June 1910), who on 13 September 1942 married Frank Alleyne Stockdale, and had issue
 Barbara Anstruther-Gough-Calthorpe (24 October 1911 – 30 December 2006), who on 4 February 1932 married Ian St John Lawson-Johnston, and had issue

References

External links
 William Addams Reitwiesner. "Ancestry of Isabella Calthorpe"

1872 births
1957 deaths
People educated at Harrow School
Baronets in the Baronetage of the United Kingdom
Gough-Calthorpe family
British Army General List officers
British Army personnel of World War I
Fitzroy